Vasundhara Devi (born 16 August 1939), known by her stage name Kanchana, is an Indian actress who worked in Tamil, Telugu, and Kannada films, in addition to Malayalam and Hindi films.

Early life and Career
Kanchana was born as Vasundhra Devi on 16 August 1939 in Madras, Tamil Nadu of India to a Telugu-speaking family. Her father suffered business losses, and she went to work as an air hostess to support her family, when she was discovered by a friend of film director C. V. Sridhar on a plane where he was a passenger, who later suggested her to him. Sridhar gave her the lead role in his film Kaadhalikka Neramillai in 1963 and changed her name to Kanchana, since there was already another actress named Vasundhara Devi, mother of actress Vyjayanthimala. Kanchana acted in over 150 films – Tamil, Telugu, Kannada and Hindi, with a successful acting career. She had a successful career in Tamil films, especially between 1964 and 1977 as a lead heroine. Her critically acclaimed films include Kaadhalikka Neramillai, Thedi Vantha Thirumagal, Parakkum Paavai, Kodimalar, Adhey Kangal, Bama Vijayam, Naalum Therindavan, Thangai, Thulabaram, Ponnu Mappilai, Shanti Nilayam, Chella Penn, Uthiravindri Ulle Vaa, Vilaiyaattu Pillai, Sivanda Mann, Nyayam Ketkirom, Avalukendru Or Manam, and Engalakkum Kaadhal Varum. She retired from films in the ,id-80s itself. In 2005, she was presented with the MGR award and in 2007 the ANR Swarna Kankanam award. In Tamil, her pairing with Ravichandran was the most famous with all their films - Adhey Kangal, Kadhalikka Neram Illai, Utharavindri Ullevaa, Kadhal Jyoti, Thedivandha Thirumagal and Naalum Therindavan being hits. She acted in some films with R. Muthuraman  including Kaadhalikka Neramillai, Kodimalar, Thulabharam (Tamil version), Thangai, Bama Vijayam and Avalukendru Or Manam. She also acted with Sivaji Ganesan in Sivandha Mann, which was a blockbuster hit along with Vilayattu Pillai and Avan Oru Sarithiram. She did two films with MGR - Naan Yen Pirandhen and Parakkum Paavai as the second lead heroine of the film. Apart from that, she was paired with many Tamil heroes like A. V. M. Rajan, S. S. Rajendran, Gemini Ganesan , Jaishankar, Ravichandran and Sivakumar in Tamil. Her last film as lead heroine in Tamil was Avan Oru Sarithiram in and Babruvahana in Kannada, both in 1977. Her performances in the movies Pavitra Bandham & Manchivaadu were well appreciated and recognized. She played Uttara in the film Veerabhimanyu. The following year she acted in the Annapurna Pictures' film Aatma Gowravam with veteran director K. Viswanath. She acted with Krishnam Raju in some glamorous roles in Neeti Nijayitee (1972), Parivartana (1975), Nenante Nene and Dharma Daata in addition to Shri Krishnavataram (1967). After her retirement as a heroine, she acted in supporting roles acted in films such as Ananda Bhairavi, Shrimad Virat Veerabrahmendra Swami Charitra, Johnny and Mouna Ragam. Kanchana appeared in OLX commercial (Tamil/Telugu) in 2015. She made her comeback to films with Arjun Reddy in 2017 as the titular character's grandmother.

Personal life
The actress later won back her properties in T. Nagar, Chennai around 6 grounds, with the Court ruling against her parents. It was learned that one day her father took the signature of Kanchana on a white paper and without her knowledge converted total assets on his name. After a long legal battle, she won and regained her wealth. . Kanchana along with her sister, Girija, donated their property in Chennai, then worth around Rs. 15 crore, to Tirumala Tirupati Devasthanams (TTD) on 25 October 2010. She remains happy, single and unmarried to date currently residing in Hyderabad.

Filmography

Telugu

Tamil

Kannada

Malayalam

Hindi

Awards

 She was presented with the MGR award in 2005.
ANR Swarna Kankanam award in 2007.
Kalaimamani award for her distinguished services for Tamil Cinema by the Government of Tamil Nadu, 2013
 Karnataka Rajyotsava Award by State Government Of Karnataka in 2017

References

External links

1939 births
Living people
Actresses in Tamil cinema
Actresses in Telugu cinema
Actresses in Hindi cinema
Actresses in Kannada cinema
Actresses in Malayalam cinema
Indian film actresses
20th-century Indian actresses
Telugu actresses
Actresses from Chennai
21st-century Indian actresses